Allershausen is a municipality in the district of Freising, in Upper Bavaria, Germany.

References

Freising (district)